Tangwang may refer to:

 Tangwang County of Yichun, Heilongjiang, China
 Tangwang language, a language spoken in Dongxiang County, Linxia, China
 Tangwang town, a town of Dongxiang County, Linxia, China